The Oselvar or Oselver is a small wooden rowing boat traditionally built and used along the west coast of Norway. The Oselvar is a clinker built boat with thin, very wide planks. Almost all parts of an Oselvar are made of pine, with only the keel of oak.

History
This type of boat has been very common in the outer regions of Hordaland for hundreds of years.  It was named after the major important building site for this type of boat during the 18th century, at the mouth of the Oselva River in Os in Hordaland county. In the early 1800s, boat building was an important industry in Os and the neighboring village of Tysnes, on the other side of the fjord. The stylized figure of an Oselvar appears on the coat of arms of the municipality of Os. 

Dating from at least the 1500s and continuing until 1860, these boats were exported in kit form principally to the Shetland and Orkney islands.  During the North Sea crossing, the wooden boats were taken apart and then 'flat packed' for shipping. Instead of sending complicated assembly instructions, they sent Norwegian boatbuilders to re-build them.

Although initially a working row or sail boat, the Oselvar also has a long tradition as a leisure craft. A boat which could achieve both grace and speed was perfect for sailing and rowing competitions. The first regatta was arranged by the Bergen Sailing Association on Midsummer's Day in 1871. Today several clubs and sailing associations are engaged in promoting the traditions of the Oselvar, both as a sports and leisure boat. In 2009, the boat was voted Norwegian national boat in a poll held by the Norwegian Society for Sea Rescue.

See also
Yoal
Faering

References

Related reading
Leather, John (1990) Clinker Boatbuilding (Adlard Coles)

External links 
Film footage from Oselvar-regatta.
Video from sailing the Oselvar at Austevoll, west coast of Norway.
Video from sailing Oselvar regatta at the Tysnes island, June 2016, Norway.
bt.no, Video, ends with footage of two brothers rowing an oselvar.]
Photograph Gallery
Oselvar Boat Yard

Os, Hordaland
Boat types